Dico is a village and municipality in the Lerik Rayon of Azerbaijan. It has a population of 280. The municipality consists of the villages of Dico, Nısa, and Təndul.

References

Populated places in Lerik District